Kang Hui (born 17 January 1972) is a Chinese news anchor for China Central Television, the main state announcer of China. He is now the President of the Broadcast, China Central Television.

He won the Golden Mike Award in 2008.

He is known all over China as an announcer for the 7:00 pm CCTV News program Xinwen Lianbo, which has reach all over China on various networks and internationally, is one of the most watched news programs in the world.

Biography
Kang Hui was born in Wuji County, Hebei in January 1972, and grew up in Shijiazhuang. He graduated from Shijiazhuang No.40 Meddle School and the Secondary School attached to Hebei Normal University.

After graduating from Communication University of China on 23rd Nov 1992 he was assigned to China Central Television to be a host. He hosted Xinwen Lianbo since December 8, 2007.

On December 22, 2007, Kang Hui was employed as a professor at Guangxi University for Nationalities.

Beginning in 2015, Kang became a host on the CCTV New Year's Gala. He is the first Xinwen Lianbo announcer to also host the lunar new year celebration since Zhao Zhongxiang.

Works

Television
 Xinwen Lianbo

Awards
 2008 Golden Mike Award

Personal life
Kang married his school friend Liu Yajie in Beijing in 2000.

References

1972 births
People from Shijiazhuang
Communication University of China alumni
Peking University alumni
Tsinghua University alumni
Living people
CCTV newsreaders and journalists